The following television stations operate on virtual channel 2 in Canada:

 CBFT-DT in Montreal, Quebec
 CBUT-DT in Vancouver, British Columbia
 CFAP-DT in Quebec City, Quebec
 CFGC-DT-2 in North Bay, Ontario
 CHBC-DT in Kelowna, British Columbia
 CICT-DT in Calgary, Alberta
 CJBR-DT in Rimouski, Quebec
 CKAL-DT-1 in Lethbridge, Alberta
 CKCK-DT in Regina, Saskatchewan
 CKCW-DT in Moncton, New Brunswick
 CKPR-DT in Thunder Bay, Ontario
 CKRT-DT-1 in Baie-Saint-Paul, Quebec
 CKRT-DT-2 in Dégelis, Quebec
 CKSA-DT in Lloydminster, Alberta/Saskatchewan

02 virtual TV stations in Canada